I'm a Stranger is a 1952 British comedy film directed by Brock Williams and starring Greta Gynt, James Hayter and Hector Ross. In the film, various different parties search for a missing will which leaves a fortune to a stranger from Calcutta.

Cast
 Greta Gynt as herself
 James Hayter as Horatio Flowerdew
 Hector Ross as Inspector Craddock
 Jean Cadell as Hannah Mackenzie
 Patric Doonan as George Westcott
 Charles Lloyd Pack as Mr. Cringle
 Martina Mayne as Mary
 Fulton Mackay as Alastair Campbell

Critical reception
TV Guide called the film "Amusing at times but unmemorable."

References

External links

1952 films
Films directed by Brock Williams
1952 comedy films
British comedy films
Films scored by Jack Beaver
British black-and-white films
1950s English-language films
1950s British films